The 1969 New York Jets season was the tenth season for the team, and their final season in the American Football League (AFL). Attempting to defend their AFL championship and Super Bowl III title, they failed to improve on their 11-3 record from 1968, however, they won the AFL Eastern Division again with a 10–4 record (their last winning season until 1981). In the divisional playoffs, they fell to the eventual AFL and Super Bowl IV champion, the Kansas City Chiefs.

Roster

Regular season

Standings

Season schedule

Game summaries

Week 1

Postseason

Awards and honors
 Joe Namath, Co-AFL MVP
 Joe Namath, UPI AFL-AFC Player of the Year

References

External links
1969 team stats

New York Jets seasons
New York Jets
New York Jets
1960s in Queens